Georg Hack (born 20 February 1950) is a former international speedway rider from West Germany.

Speedway career 
Hack reached the final of the Speedway World Championship in the 1982 Individual Speedway World Championship representing West Germany. He has also reached the final of the Individual Speedway Long Track World Championship on eight occasions during the period 1977 until 1985.

He rode in the top tier of British Speedway, riding for Ipswich Witches.

World final appearances

Individual World Championship
 1982 -  Los Angeles, Memorial Coliseum - 11th - 6pts

World Pairs Championship
 1978 -  Chorzów, Silesian Stadium (with Hans Wassermann) - 6th - 13pts

World Team Cup
 1981 -  Olching, Speedway Stadion Olching (with Egon Müller / Karl Maier / Georg Gilgenreiner) - 3rd - 28pts (5)
 1982 -  London, White City Stadium (with Karl Maier / Egon Müller / Alois Wiesböck / Georg Gilgenreiner) - 3rd - 18pts (5)

References 

1950 births
Living people
German speedway riders
Ipswich Witches riders
Sportspeople from Landshut